Joe Lipari, also known as J.R. Lipari, (born October 5, 1979) is an American humorist &  agnostic minister.

Personal life 

Born in Passaic, New Jersey, the first of three children, Lipari is a distant relative of Fred Allen.

After high school Lipari joined The United States Army and became a member of the 3rd Infantry Division. An expert marksman, Lipari worked as a military advisor to defense contractors like Honeywell. As an advisor, Lipari was a key member of the development of the Land Warrior system. After two years in the military Lipari blew out his knee and is now a Disabled Veteran.

Prior to leaving the Army, Lipari attended classes at Troy State University, Bergen County Community College, Santa Monica College, The Connecticut School of Broadcasting, The New York Film Academy (where he was a student of Vojtěch Jasný) and received camera training at Panavision in Hollywood (from Jay Holben) before earning a Bachelor of Fine Arts focused in Advertising, Design & Visual Storytelling, with honors, at School of Visual Arts. Lipari studied with Richard Wilde, James C. Strouse, Nick Paparone, Louise Fili, Valentina Caniglia, Kevin O'Callaghan, Gail Anderson (graphic designer) and Milton Glaser.

An avid yoga enthusiast, Lipari practices frequently with close friend Tara Stiles. Lipari is a two time graduate of the Strala Yoga 200 hour teacher training program. Lipari teaches yoga sporadically, in the US and abroad.

Ordained by Universal Life Church, Joe is an agnostic minister who performs wedding ceremonies for couples of various gender and sexual identities. Joe is also a founding member of the Church of Universal Suffrage, "The Church of Universal Suffrage is a nationwide, officially registered, non-profit religious institution that holds regular, weekly Sunday Service in meditation on the nature of voter suppression. ".

Career 

In February 2003 Lipari first tried stand-up at Caroline's on Broadway, in New York City.

Lipari received training as a comedy writer and improvisor at The People's Improv Theater in New York City; where he worked with Ali Farahnakian, Kristen Schaal, Kurt Braunohler and Ellie Kemper.

From April 2004 through June 2007 Lipari worked as a writer/producer for Starlog and Fangoria and as the on-air producer for Fangoria Radio (hosted by Dee Snider and Debbie Rochon) on Sirius Satellite Radio. After leaving Fangoria Lipari worked as a freelance writer and producer for various clients and as a production assistant/camera operator for MTV's hit reality shows The Hills and The City.

In 2005 Lipari started performing at Gotham Comedy Club, where he began working with Eddie Brill, Greg Giraldo, Cooper, Rego, Jim Mendrinos, Amy Schumer, and Jessica Kirson.

In 2009 and 2010, Lipari and Scout Durwood hosted Something Awesome, a live show that was "Part stand-up, part burlesque and all awesome". The show was a late night Friday night show at Comix Comedy Club in New York City's Meat Packing District. After a sold out Something Awesome Greg Giraldo told Lipari that he thought the story Lipari told on stage would make a fun movie idea and Lipari should write a script. After Giraldo's advice Lipari wrote a script for the short film that would later be called Dream Job.

After doing stand-up about becoming a yoga teacher at New York City's Gotham Comedy Club, Lipari was approached by a casting associate who was looking for a "sarcastic yogi". After a few questions Lipari was cast in Eat, Pray, Love, starring Julia Roberts.

Lipari wrote, produced and directed the short film, Dream Job, as a thesis project for The New York Film Academy's one-year filmmaking program. Dream Job was an official selection at various film festivals (including The Friars Club Comedy Film Festival, and Hollywood Shorts) and was runner-up for an Audience Award at the 16th annual PictureStart Film Festival.

In 2012, Lipari began teaching a DIY : No Budget Filmmaking workshop at the Improv Olympic in Hollywood (I.O. West) and The People's Improv Theater in New York City. In the 7-week workshop, Lipari helps a small group of filmmakers write manageable scripts and produce 5- to 10-minute short films on limited time, money and resources.

In the summer of 2012 Lipari returned to the New York to work at Motive NYC with long-time collaborator Chris Valentino. While at Motive Lipari oversaw the production of the McDonald's/Coca-Cola Fountain Joy app as well as various motion graphics projects for TV broadcast; including House Hunters International. Lipari left Motive after it joined the Lively Group to work on various TV and film productions including 30 for 30 on ESPN and The Amazing Spider-Man 2.

In 2014 Lipari accepted a position as VP of PR & Marketing for Serious Audio Video, an industry leading Smart Home and Integrated Systems firm in Union City, NJ. Commercial Integrator Magazine selected Lipari as one of the Top Industry Influencers Under 40 in 2016.

New Year's Weekend 2015, Lipari took part in the Guinness World Records record breaking 60-hour Variety Show at New York City's Metropolitan Room.

In 2017 Lipari worked on season 2 of Marvel/Netflix show Jessica Jones and accepted a position as a Senior Creative Manager for BSE Global where he led the creative department for the Brooklyn Nets, New York Islanders, Brooklyn Boxing, Barclays Center, Webster Hall and Nassau Coliseum.

While visiting Japan to perform stand up at English language comedy shows (Summer 2019) in Osaka, Joe climbed Mount Fuji and hiked the Kumano Kodo. Upon returning from Japan in 2019 Joe was recruited by Troops to Teachers to fill teaching vacancies in some of New York City's under served communities.

When his schedule permits, Lipari is a regular at top comedy venues including The Improv,The Ice House   Gotham Comedy Club, Carolines on Broadway, The People's Improv Theater and I.O. West.

Terrorism 
After being frustrated with the customer service at an Apple Store, in September 2009, Lipari jokingly paraphrased a quote from the book/movie Fight Club, which referred to use of firearms, on his Facebook page. In under 2 hours, NYPD SWAT arrived at his door and, after searching his apartment, they brought Lipari to the station to be questioned by Homeland Security.

Lipari spent a year in court clearing his name of all charges, even turning down multiple plea bargains. Eventually The City of New York dropped all charges, including making terrorist threats and disorderly conduct. Since then Lipari has received offers from lawyers pushing him to sue New York City for wrongful imprisonment, but he has no plans to sue. When Emily Epstein from Metro New York pressed him as to why, he replied "I'd rather be rich on my own accord, not by suing the people who are just trying to keep us safe."

His story was first covered by This American Life in September 2010. It was also a cover story for Metro New York and featured in Britain's daily newspaper The Guardian. Lipari appears in the documentary Terms and Conditions May Apply alongside Moby, Orson Scott Card and an ambush of Mark Zuckerberg, the documentary premiered at Sundance. Lipari also appeared w/ John Stossel on the Fox News special "Policing America".

In light of the NSA/Edward Snowden controversy, Lipari created the failed White House petition to designate June 9 "Everyone Is a Suspect Day".

References

External links 
 Joe Lipari's Official website
 
 Joe Lipari on This American Life
 Joe Lipari via The Ice House (comedy club)
 Joe Lipari via Strala yoga

American male comedians
American comedy writers
Writers from Passaic, New Jersey
American people of Italian descent
United States Army soldiers
1979 births
Living people
Writers from New York City
New York Film Academy alumni
Comedians from New York City
Film directors from New York City
Film directors from New Jersey
21st-century American comedians
Ministers
Universal Life Church
American yoga teachers
yoga
Lipari
American humanists